The Altamont Formation is a geologic formation in Illinois. It preserves fossils dating back to the Carboniferous period.

See also

 List of fossiliferous stratigraphic units in Illinois

References
 

Carboniferous Illinois
Carboniferous Iowa
Carboniferous Kansas
Carboniferous Missouri
Carboniferous geology of Oklahoma
Carboniferous southern paleotropical deposits